Total Immersion was an augmented reality company based in Suresnes, France. The company maintained offices in Europe, North America, and Asia and became defunct in 2014.

History 
Total Immersion was founded in 1999 in Aubervilliers, France by current CEO, Bruno Uzzan, and former general director Valentin Lefèvre. Their headquarters were in Suresnes, France. As the company grew, Total Immersion established their first international office in San Francisco, California in the United States. After settling their American branch closer to clientele in Los Angeles, they had offices in London, Hong Kong, and Tokyo with over 90 employees in their 5 international offices. The company quietly went defunct in 2014 after a supposed intellectual property sale by CEO Bruno Uzzan.

Press
Community: In June 2010 it was announced at the very first Augmented Reality convention ever held, that Total Immersion had created a community logo in attempt to urge a creation of shared standards and a communications framework. This collective, participative process was aimed at advancing uniformity and organization in the world of Augmented Reality users so that the technological community and new members could recognize the logo immediately.

Awards
2009
 "Best Web Based Augmented Reality Demo" & "Best Innovative Cultural Product" of 2009, Awarded by Augmented Planet for Dokeo Augmented Reality Children’s Encyclopedia
2010
 Silver Award for Statoil Event, Presented by Jack Morton Experiential Digital Events IVCA Awards
 "Best Technological Innovation in e-marketing" & "Best Augmented Reality Application Award" at Mobile Video Days Awards
2011
 eCommerce Award Winner for best digital innovation product : ATOL TryLive - bring together “Physical and Digital” to try online glasses on live client faces to improve consumers shopping experience.
 "Best Use of Print", Bronze Award for Scirroco Cup Campaign, Ogilvy Beijing for Volkswagen at Media Lions Cannes Film Festival
2012
 Phénix Bronze Award, by the Union of Announcers for the Volkswagen Augmented Reality Application

Projects
Total Immersion provided augmented reality projects for the following notable clients:

Orange (telecommunications):
Ray-Ban
McDonald's
Apple
Coca-Cola
Nike
Dior
Gillette
Hallmark Cards
Taco Bell
Volkswagen
Pringles
Kia Motors
Cartoon Network
Yoplait
Citroën
Paramount Pictures
eBay
Olympus Corporation
Volvo
Topps
Alstom
Nissan Motors

References

External links 
 Wired Magazine, Total Immersion Augmented Reality Standards Proposal, AR+
 Engage Digital, Total Immersion Announces Adobe Alliance

Augmented reality
Software companies of France
Advergaming